Sharon Fichman and Maria Sanchez were the defending champions, but decided not to participate this year.

Gabriela Dabrowski and Michaëlla Krajicek won the title, defeating Ashley Weinhold and Caitlin Whoriskey 6–4, 6–3 in the final.

Seeds

Draw

References
Main Draw

Tevlin Women's Challenger
Tevlin Women's Challenger